Paul Hamer is an Australian politician. He has been a Labor Party member of the Victorian Legislative Assembly since November 2018, representing the seat of Box Hill.

He was a civil engineer before his election.

In October 2019, Hamer gained attention for publicly raising the flag of China over the Box Hill police station on the National Day of the People's Republic of China.

References

Year of birth missing (living people)
Living people
Australian Labor Party members of the Parliament of Victoria
Members of the Victorian Legislative Assembly
21st-century Australian politicians
Australian Jews
Jewish Australian politicians